HMS Polsham was one of 93 ships of the  of inshore minesweepers.

Their names were chosen from villages ending in -ham. The minesweeper was named after Polsham in Somerset.

HMS Polsham was sold in February 1967 to the Port of London Authority who converted the vessel into a hydrographic survey ship, operated out of the Thames Navigation Service centre at Gravesend, Kent. She was renamed the MV Maplin. It is understood that she no longer operates in this capacity, but her fate is unknown.

References
Blackman, R.V.B. ed. Jane's Fighting Ships (1953)

 

Ham-class minesweepers
Royal Navy ship names
1958 ships